Route 231, also known as Random Island Road, is a  east–west highway in the Canadian province of Newfoundland and Labrador. It serves as the only road connection between Newfoundland and Random Island.

Route description

Route 231 begins on Newfoundland in Milton at an intersection with Route 230A (Old Bonavista Highway). It immediately leaves town and heads east to cross the Hefferton Causeway onto Random Island. The highway now passes along the southern coastline of the island as it goes through the communities of Random Heights and Elliott's Cove, where Route 231 intersects with a spur road leading to Snook's Harbour. Route 231 now passes through Weybridge, Lady Cove, and Robinsons Bight before turning more inland and having an intersection with a spur road leading to Hickman's Harbour. The highway passes northeast through hilly terrain for a few kilometres before passing through Britannia, where it has a Y-Intersection with a spur road leading into town and Lower Lance Cove. Route 231 now curves back to the northwest to pass through Middle Lance Cove and Petley before coming to an end at the edge of the asphalt pavement just outside the latter community, with Random Island Road continuing west as a gravel road.

Major intersections

References

231